Vusi Thanda (born 12 September 1951) is a South African actor, best known for his role in the SABC 1 Sitcom Emzini Wezinsizwa as Tshawe.

Vusi Thanda is of a Xhosa background, he was born in South Africa.

Thanda was nominated in the Wall of Fame in 2017.

In May 2021, he landed on a role of starring in Ikhaya Labadala  comedy series airs on Netflix.

References

21st-century South African male actors
20th-century South African male actors
South African people of Xhosa descent
1963 births
Living people